Maardu Linnameeskond is a football club based in Maardu, Estonia. The team compete in the II liiga, the fourth tier of the Estonian football league system. They adopted their current name in 2016, before being promoted to the Estonian top tier Meistriliiga for the first time in 2019. They were relegated the following season and played in Esiliiga for the next two seasons. After winning 2021 Esiliiga they should have been promoted to Meistriliiga, but due to financial reasons they waived the opportunity and were relegated to II liiga, taking their reserve squad's place.

Honours

Domestic

 Esiliiga
 Winners (3): 2017, 2018, 2021
 Esiliiga B
 Winners (1): 2015
 II Liiga
 Winners (1): 2013
 III Liiga
 Winners (1): 2011
 Third place (4): 2007, 2008, 2009, 2010
 IV Liiga
 Third place (1): 2006

Players

Current squad
 ''As of 12 August 2021.

Personnel

Current technical staff

Managerial history

Statistics

League and Cup

References

External links
Home page

Harju County
Football clubs in Estonia
1997 establishments in Estonia
Meistriliiga clubs